Public Relations Review is a peer-reviewed academic journal covering public relations that is published quarterly by Elsevier. The editor-in-chief is Maureen Taylor. It was established in 1975. According to Journal Citation Reports, the journal has a 2019 impact factor of 2.321, placing it in the second quartile for Communication studies and in the third quartile for Business.

References

External links

Business and management journals
Elsevier academic journals
English-language journals
Publications established in 1975
Quarterly journals